Self Creek is an unincorporated community located in Oktibbeha County, Mississippi.

References 

Unincorporated communities in Oktibbeha County, Mississippi